Kaie Kõrb (born 1 April 1961, in Pärnu) is an Estonian ballet dancer and dance teacher. In 2006 she was described as "perhaps the country's most famous dancer today".

She graduated from the Tallinn Ballet School (Tallinna Balletikool) in 1980, and was prima ballerina of  the Estonian National Opera. She is now director of the Tallinn Ballet School.

References

External links
1985 photograph, performing Lazarev's Master and Margarita 

1961 births
Living people
Estonian ballet dancers
Estonian female dancers
Recipients of the Order of the White Star, 3rd Class
People from Pärnu
Estonian ballerinas